Trond Sevåg Abrahamsen (born 16 July 1960 in Hammerfest) is a Norwegian ice hockey player. He played for the Norwegian national ice hockey team, and participated at the Winter Olympics in 1980 and 1984. He was awarded Gullpucken as best Norwegian ice hockey player in 1983. He also played for Norwegian team IL Manglerud/Star.

See also

References

External links
 

1960 births
Living people
Ice hockey players at the 1980 Winter Olympics
Ice hockey players at the 1984 Winter Olympics
Norwegian ice hockey players
Olympic ice hockey players of Norway
People from Hammerfest
Sportspeople from Troms og Finnmark